Aleksei Baranov may refer to:

 Aleksei Viktorovich Baranov (b. 1980), Russian footballer
 Aleksey Baranov (skier) (born 1954), Soviet Olympic skier